Cat in the Hat is the first studio album by the Washington D.C.-based go-go band Little Benny & the Masters, originally released on cassette and LP in 1987. The album was remastered and reissued in 1990 on CD. The album includes the band's most popular hits "Let Me Show You" (which samples The Jacksons song "Show You the Way to Go"), "The Message", and "Cat In the Hat".

Track listing

Personnel
Anthony "Little Benny" Harley – lead vocals, trumpet
William "Ju Ju" House – drums
Elmo – congas, percussions
Ivan Goff – keyboard
Godfather Mark – keyboard
Bolg – electric guitar

References

External links
 Cat In the Hat at Discogs

1987 debut albums
Anthony Harley albums